XYZ is a British game show that aired on BBC1 from 15 November 1993 to 26 January 1994. It is hosted by George Marshall.

Format
On each edition, three contestants played against each other for the chance to play for a major prize.

The game is played on a board of 24 squares called the "Alphabank", of which the 23 squares were the first 23 letters of the alphabet and the 24th square was the 'XYZ' square. The idea of the game was to try to have the longest chain of letters in a row without any breaks in the chain.

External links

1990s British game shows
1993 British television series debuts
1994 British television series endings
BBC television game shows
English-language television shows